Tea for the Tillerman 2 (stylised as Tea for the Tillerman²) is the sixteenth studio album by singer-songwriter Yusuf / Cat Stevens, released on 18 September 2020. It is a re-imagining of his hit 1970 album Tea for the Tillerman.

Track listing

Personnel
 Yusuf / Cat Stevens – Spanish guitar, acoustic guitar, electric guitar, 12-string guitar, grand piano, keyboards, harpsichord, lead vocals
 Alun Davies – acoustic guitar, backing vocals, vocals on "Father and Son"
 Jim Cregan – acoustic guitar, electric guitar, backing vocals
 Eric Appapoulay – acoustic guitar, electric guitar, Spanish guitar, backing vocals
 Bruce Lynch – double bass, electric bass
  Martil Allcock - bass on (3), piano (3) 
 Peter-John Vettese – keyboards, organ, synth horns, backing vocals, string arrangements
 Andreas Andersson - clarinet on "Wild World"
 Kwame Yeboah– drums, percussion, keyboards, backing vocals
 John Ashton Thomas – string arrangements on (1, 2, 4, 6, 10) 
 Christopher Nightingale – arrangements
 Brother Ali – rap on "Longer Boats"
 Voxaphonic - backing vocals on (1, 3, 10)

Charts

References

2020 albums
Cat Stevens albums
Albums produced by Paul Samwell-Smith
Island Records albums
A&M Records albums